Five ships of the Royal Navy have been named HMS Russell in honour of Edward Russell, 1st Earl of Orford.
 , an 80-gun second-rate ship of the line, rebuilt in 1735 and sunk in 1762 at Sheerness.
 , launched in 1764, was a 74-gun third-rate ship of the line, sold in 1811.
 , launched in 1822, was a 74-gun third-rate ship of the line, broken up in 1865.
Broken up in 1985.

See also
 , a frigate in commission from 1943 to 1946, named Russell briefly during 1943 while under construction

References
 

Royal Navy ship names